The 2000 Barangay Ginebra Kings season was the 22nd season of the franchise in the Philippine Basketball Association (PBA).

Draft picks

Transactions

Roster

Elimination round

Games won

References

Barangay Ginebra San Miguel seasons
Barangay